KCYI-LP (97.7 FM) is a low-power FM radio station licensed to Oklahoma City, Oklahoma, United States. The station is currently owned by Edwards Broadcasting.

History
The station was assigned the call sign KSQE-LP on February 20, 2015. The call sign was changed to KCYI-LP.

References

External links
 

CYI-LP
CYI-LP
Radio stations established in 2016
2016 establishments in Oklahoma